Kayamkulam Kochunniyude Makan is a 1976 Indian Malayalam-language period drama film directed by J. Sasikumar, written by Pappanamkodu Lakshmanan and produced by Thiruppathi Chettiyar. It is a sequel to the 1966 film Kayamkulam Kochunni. The film stars Prem Nazir, Jayabharathi, Vidhubala, KP Ummer and MG Soman. The film has musical score by M. K. Arjunan.

Plot

Cast 

Prem Nazir
Jayabharathi
KP Ummer
Vidhubala
Bahadoor
M. G. Soman
Vincent
Thikkurissy Sukumaran Nair
Prema
Meena
Reena

Soundtrack 
The music was composed by M. K. Arjunan and the lyrics were written by Pappanamkodu Lakshmanan.

References

External links 
 

1970s Malayalam-language films
1976 films
Films directed by J. Sasikumar
^Kochunni2